Arthur Dimmesdale is a fictional character in the 1850 romance The Scarlet Letter by Nathaniel Hawthorne. A Puritan minister, he has fathered an illegitimate child, Pearl, with Hester Prynne and considers himself unable to reveal his sin.

Next to Hester Prynne herself, Dimmesdale is often considered Hawthorne's finest character. His dilemma takes up a significant portion of the novel, bringing out Hawthorne's most famous statements on many of the concepts that recur throughout his works: guilt and redemption, truth and falsehood, and others. Dimmesdale faces a problem that is both simple and paradoxical: the knowledge of his sin, his inability to disclose it to Puritan society, and his desire for confession. He attempts to ameliorate the pressure of this position by punishing himself (both physically and mentally) and by insisting to his parishioners that he is a base, worthless creature. Without the awareness of his specific crime, however, his flock takes his protestations of worthlessness as further evidence of his holiness (a fact of which he is well aware) since, in the Puritan conception, awareness of one's sinful worthlessness is a necessary component of whatever virtue is available to humans; thus, Dimmesdale has been taken as an example of a conflict typical of Puritans (or seen as such by Hawthorne from his historical distance).

Portrayals
Dimmesdale has been portrayed by:
 Lars Hanson (1926)
 Hardie Albright (1934)
 Gary Oldman (1995)

The Scarlet Letter characters
Fictional clergy
Fictional characters from Boston
Literary characters introduced in 1850